is a railway station on the Ōu Main Line in the city of Fukushima, Fukushima Prefecture, Japan, operated by East Japan Railway Company (JR East).

Lines

Station layout
Niwasaka Station has a single island platform and a single side platform connected to the station building by a footbridge. The station is unattended.

Platforms

History
Niwasaka Station opened on 15 May 1899. The station was absorbed into the JR East network upon the privatization of JNR on 1 April 1987. The current station building dates from March 2003.

Surrounding area
Niwasaka Post Office

See also
 List of railway stations in Japan

References

External links

   

Stations of East Japan Railway Company
Railway stations in Fukushima Prefecture
Ōu Main Line
Railway stations in Japan opened in 1899
Fukushima (city)